Hauer is a surname, and may refer to:

 Brett Hauer (born 1971), American ice hockey player
 Elena Hauer (born 1986), German footballer
 Erwin Hauer (1926-2017), Austrian-born American sculptor
 Franz Ritter von Hauer (1822–1899), Austrian geologist
 Jakob Wilhelm Hauer (1881–1962), founder of the German Faith Movement
 Jerome Hauer, American politician and businessman
 Joachim Hauer (born 1991), Norwegian ski jumper
 Josef Matthias Hauer (1883–1959), Austrian composer and music theorist
 Karen Hauer (born 1982), Venezuelan dancer
 Matthias Hauer (born 1977), German politician
 Rutger Hauer (1944–2019), Dutch actor
 Torodd Hauer (1922–2010), Norwegian speed skater

See also
 Hauer, Wisconsin, unincorporated community
 Hower, surname

German-language surnames
Occupational surnames